McPaul is a former townsite and unincorporated community in Fremont County, Iowa, United States. It was located at the intersection of County Roads J18 and L31, near the Missouri River. It is three miles west of Thurman, at 40.887295N -95.7950145W.

History
McPaul was founded as a railroad town. The Kansas City, St. Joseph and Council Bluffs Railroad passed through McPaul in the late 1800s. Much of modern-day Interstate 29 covers the former townsite; only a few scattered houses remain. The McPaul State Wildlife Management Area is located north of the townsite.

McPaul's population was 100 in 1925.

McPaul was impacted by the 2019 Midwestern U.S. floods. One homeowner in McPaul had to wait 180 days for floodwater to drain; the home flooded again five days later. The McPaul exit off Interstate 29 was still closed, with visible standing water, in early October. Buyouts were planned for local residents.

References

Unincorporated communities in Fremont County, Iowa
Unincorporated communities in Iowa